Rupert König (born 3 April 1937) is an Austrian boxer. He competed at the 1960 Summer Olympics and the 1964 Summer Olympics.

1964 Olympic results
Below is the record of Rupert König, an Austrian light welterweight boxer who competed at the 1964 Tokyo Olympics:

 Round of 64: bye
 Round of 32: lost to Iosif Mihalic (Romania) referee stopped contest

References

1937 births
Living people
Austrian male boxers
Olympic boxers of Austria
Boxers at the 1960 Summer Olympics
Boxers at the 1964 Summer Olympics
People from Berchtesgaden
Sportspeople from Upper Bavaria
Light-welterweight boxers
20th-century Austrian people